Gonocaryum is a genus of plants in the family Cardiopteridaceae described as a genus in 1861.

Gonocaryum is native to Southeast Asia, southern China, and Papuasia.

Species

formerly included
Gonocaryum sinense - Osmanthus marginatus

References

External links

Cardiopteridaceae
Asterid genera